Zhujiang New Town Station  is an interchange metro station on Line 3 and Line 5 of the Guangzhou Metro. It started operations on 28December 2005 and is located under the junction of Huaxia Road and Huacheng Avenue in Zhujiang New Town, Tianhe District, Guangzhou.

Station layout

Exits

See other 
Zhujiang New Town

References

Railway stations in China opened in 2005
Guangzhou Metro stations in Tianhe District